In Christianity, evangelism or witnessing is the act of preaching the gospel with the intention of sharing the message and teachings of Jesus Christ.

Christians who specialize in evangelism are often known as evangelists, whether they are in their home communities or living as missionaries in the field, although some Christian traditions refer to such people as missionaries in either case. Some Christian traditions consider evangelists to be in a leadership position; they may be found preaching to large meetings or in governance roles. In addition, Christian groups who encourage evangelism are sometimes known as evangelistic or evangelist.

Etymology

The word evangelist comes from the Koine Greek word  (transliterated as euangelion) via Latinised evangelium as used in the canonical titles of the Four Gospels, authored by (or attributed to) Matthew, Mark, Luke, and John (also known as the Four Evangelists). The Greek word  originally meant a reward given to the messenger for good news ( = "good",  = "I bring a message"; the word "angel" comes from the same root) and later "good news" itself.

The verb form of euangelion, (translated as "evangelism"), occurs rarely in older Greek literature outside the New Testament, making its meaning more difficult to ascertain.  Parallel texts of the Gospels of Luke and Mark reveal a synonymous relationship between the verb euangelizo and a Greek verb kerusso, which means "to proclaim".

Methods

Evangelism can include preaching or distributing bibles, tracts, newspapers and/or magazines, by the media, street evangelists, etc. The Bible records that Jesus sent out his disciples to evangelize by visiting peoples homes in pairs of two believers (cf. ). In the same text, Jesus mentioned that few people were willing to evangelize, despite there being many people who would be receptive to his Gospel message.

The child evangelism movement is a Christian evangelism movement that originated in the 20th century. It focuses on the 4/14 Window which centers on evangelizing children between the ages of 4 and 14 years old. Beginning in the 1970s, a group of Christian athletes known as The Power Team spawned an entire genre of Christian entertainment based on strong-man exploits mixed with a Christian message and usually accompanied by an opportunity to respond with a prayer for salvation. New opportunities for evangelism have been provided in recent decades by increased travel opportunities and by instant communications over the internet.

Missionary work

Catholicism

Protestantism
In 1831, the Presbyterian Mission Agency was founded by the Presbyterian Church in the United States of America.

Evangelicalism 

Various evangelical mission organizations have specialized in evangelism throughout history. In 1792, BMS World Mission was founded in Kettering, England by William Carey. In 1814, the American Baptist International Ministries was founded by the American Baptist Churches USA in United States. In 1865, OMF International was founded by Hudson Taylor in England. In 1893, in Lagos in Nigeria, SIM was founded by Walter Gowans, Rowland Bingham, and Thomas Kent. Samuel E. Hill, John H. Nicholson, and William J. Knights founded Gideons International, an organization which distributes free Bibles to hotels, motels, hospitals, military bases, prisons, schools, and universities, in Janesville in Wisconsin, United States, in 1899.

In 1960, more than half of the Protestant American missionaries were evangelical. American and European Pentecostal missionaries are also numerous, Pentecostalism can develop independently by non-foreign residents in various regions of the world, notably in Africa, South America, and Asia. Youth with a Mission was founded in 1960 in United States by Loren Cunningham and his wife Darlene.

In 1974, Billy Graham and the Lausanne Committee for World Evangelization organized the First International Congress on World Evangelization in Lausanne. In 2004, South Korea became the second-largest source of missionaries in the world, after the United States and ahead of England. In 2007, there were over 10,000 Baptist missionaries in overseas missions around the world.

Controversies 
Some consider evangelism to be proselytising, while others argue it is free speech. The fact that evangelicals speak about their faith in public is often criticized by the media and it is often associated with proselytism. According to the evangelicals, freedom of religion and freedom of expression allow them to discuss their faith like they would discuss other topics.

Christian films made by American evangelical production companies are also regularly associated with proselytism. According to Sarah-Jane Murray, screenwriting teacher at the US Film and Christian Television Commission United, Christian films are works of art, not proselytism. For Hubert de Kerangat, communications manager at SAJE Distribution, a distributor of these American Christian films in France, if Christian films are considered proselytism, all films are a form of proselytism, since films of all genres could each be said to carry a message.

See also

 10/40 Window
 Child evangelism movement
 Dawah
 Open-air preaching
 Religious conversion
 Technology evangelist
 The night of churches

References 

 
Christian missions
Christian religious occupations
Practical theology
Religious activism